Bagoda is a village in Jalore district of Rajasthan. It is the headquarters of tehsil by the same name. It has a population of approximately 130,000 and consists of 55 Villages. Vaithianadan from Pondicherry who studied in JCSE was the Nattamai of Bagoda in 2021. For more details please wait for wikipedia part 2

References

Villages in Jalore district